D113 is the main state road on the island of Brač in Croatia connecting the towns of Supetar and Sumartin and ferry ports in those two towns, from where Jadrolinija ferries fly to the mainland, docking in Split and the D410 state road (from Supetar) and Makarska and the D411 state road (from Sumartin).

The road, as well as all other state roads in Croatia, is managed and maintained by Hrvatske ceste, a state-owned company.

Traffic volume 

Traffic is regularly counted and reported by Hrvatske ceste (HC), operator of the road. Furthermore, the HC report number of vehicles using Split – Supetar and Makarska – Sumartin ferry lines, connecting the D113 road to the D410 and the D411 state roads. Substantial variations between annual (AADT) and summer (ASDT) traffic volumes are attributed to the fact that the road connects a number of island resorts to the mainland.

Road junctions and populated areas

Sources

State roads in Croatia
Transport in Split-Dalmatia County
Brač